Thung Syn Neo (born 1932) is a Singaporean social worker. She developed the concept and establishment of Famly Service Centres for the Ministry of Social Services.

Biography 
Syn Neo graduated from the National University of Singapore in 1955. She worked for the government medical service as a medical social worker, and in 1965 became a lecturer in social work at the university. In 1975, she was appointed to a position at the Department of Social Work, and later at the Ministry of Social Affairs. She led a team of social welfare officers to plan a model of community-based social services centres, the first of which opened in the suburb of MacPherson in 1976. Following its success, a total of 40 similar centres were opened.

In 1981, Syn Neo joined the Housing and Development Board as its first social worker.

References

1932 births
Living people
Singaporean social workers
National University of Singapore alumni
Academic staff of the National University of Singapore